Ameranna capixaba is a species of sea snail, a marine gastropod mollusc in the family Pisaniidae. It occurs off Espírito Santo in southeastern Brazil, at depths of 45–60 m.

References

Gastropods described in 2013